Biodegradable plastics are plastics that can be decomposed by the action of living organisms, usually microbes, into water, carbon dioxide, and biomass. Biodegradable plastics are commonly produced with renewable raw materials, micro-organisms, petrochemicals, or combinations of all three.

While the words "bioplastic" and "biodegradable plastic" are similar, they are not synonymous. Not all bioplastics (plastics derived partly or entirely from biomass) are biodegradable, and some biodegradable plastics are fully petroleum based. As more companies are keen to be seen as having "Green" credentials, solutions such as using bioplastics are being investigated and implemented more. However there are many skeptics who believe that bioplastics will not solve problems others expect.

History 
Polyhydroxyalkanoate (PHA) was first observed in bacteria in 1888 by Martinus Beijerinck. In 1926, French microbiologist Maurice Lemoigne chemically identified the polymer after extracting it from Bacillus megaterium. It was not until the early 1960s that the groundwork for scaled production was laid. Several patents for the production and isolation of PHB, the simplest PHA, were administered to W.R. Grace & Co. (USA), but as a result of low yields, tainted product and high extraction costs, the operation was dissolved. When OPEC halted oil exports to the US to boost global oil prices in 1973, more plastic and  chemical companies began making significant investment in the biosynthesis of sustainable plastics. As a result, Imperial Chemical Industries (ICI UK) successfully produced PHB at a yield of 70% using the strain Alcaligenes latus. The specific PHA produced in this instance was a scl-PHA. Production efforts slowed dramatically due to the undesirable properties of the PHA produced and the diminishing threat of rising oil prices soon thereafter.

In 1983, ICI received venture capital funding and founded Marlborough Biopolymers to manufacture the first broad-application biodegradable plastic, PHBV, named Biopol. Biopol is a copolymer composed of PHB and PHV, but was still too costly to produce to disrupt the market. In 1996, Monsanto discovered a method of producing one of the two polymers in plants and acquired Biopol from Zeneca, a spinout of ICI, as a result of the potential for cheaper production.

As a result of the steep increase in oil prices in the early 2000s (to nearly $140/barrel US$ in 2008), the plastic-production industry finally sought to implement these alternatives to petroleum-based plastics. Since then, countless alternatives, produced chemically or by other bacteria, plants, seaweed and plant waste have sprung up as solutions. Geopolitical factors also impact their use.

Application 
Biodegradable plastics are commonly used for disposable items, such as packaging, cutlery, and food service containers.

In principle, biodegradable plastics could replace many applications for conventional plastics. However, this entails a number of challenges.
 Many biodegradable plastics are designed to degrade in industrial composting systems. However, this requires a well-managed waste system to ensure that this actually happens. If products made from these plastics are discarded into conventional waste streams such as landfill, or find their way into the open environment such as rivers and oceans, potential environmental benefits are not realised and evidence indicates that this can actually worsen, rather than reduce, the problem of plastic pollution.
 Plastic items labelled as 'biodegradable', but that only break down into smaller pieces like microplastics, or into smaller units that are not biodegradable, are not an improvement over conventional plastic.
 A 2009 study found that the use of biodegradable plastics was financially viable only in the context of specific regulations which limit the usage of conventional plastics. For example, biodegradable plastic bags have been compulsory in Italy since 2011 with the introduction of a specific law.

Types

Bio-based plastics 

Biologically synthesized plastics (also called bioplastics or biobased plastics) are plastics produced from natural origins, such as plants, animals, or micro-organisms.

Polyhydroxyalkanoates (PHAs) 
Polyhydroxyalkanoates are a class of biodegradable plastic naturally produced by various micro-organisms (example: Cuprividus necator). Specific types of PHAs include poly-3-hydroxybutyrate (PHB), polyhydroxyvalerate (PHV) and polyhydroxyhexanoate (PHH). The biosynthesis of PHA is usually driven by depriving organisms of certain nutrients (e.g. lack of macro elements such as phosphorus, nitrogen, or oxygen) and supplying an excess of carbon sources. PHA granules are then recovered by rupturing the micro-organisms.

PHA can be further classified into two types:

 scl-PHA from hydroxy fatty acids with short chain lengths including three to five carbon atoms are synthesized by numerous bacteria, including Cupriavidus necator and Alcaligenes latus (PHB).
 mcl-PHA from hydroxy fatty acids with medium chain lengths including six to 14 carbon atoms, can be made for example, by Pseudomonas putida.

Polylactic acid (PLA) 

Polylactic acid is thermoplastic aliphatic polyester synthesized from renewable biomass, typically from fermented plant starch such as from corn, cassava, sugarcane or sugar beet pulp. In 2010, PLA had the second-highest consumption volume of any bioplastic of the world.

PLA is compostable, but non-biodegradable according to American and European standards because it does not biodegrade outside of artificial composting conditions (see ).

Starch blends 
Starch blends are thermoplastic polymers produced by blending starch with plasticizers. Because starch polymers on their own are brittle at room temperature, plasticizers are added in a process called starch gelatinization to augment its crystallization. While all starches are biodegradable, not all plasticizers are. Thus, the biodegradability of the plasticizer determines the biodegradability of the starch blend.

Biodegradable starch blends include starch/polylactic acid, starch/polycaprolactone, and starch/polybutylene-adipate-co-terephthalate.

Others blends such as starch/polyolefin are not biodegradable.

Cellulose-based plastics 
Cellulose bioplastics are mainly the cellulose esters, (including cellulose acetate and nitrocellulose) and their derivatives, including celluloid. Cellulose can become thermoplastic when extensively modified. An example of this is cellulose acetate, which is expensive and therefore rarely used for packaging.

Lignin-based polymer composites 
Lignin-based polymer composites are bio-renewable natural aromatic polymers with biodegradable properties. Lignin is found as a byproduct of polysaccharide extraction from plant material through the production of paper, ethanol, and more. It is high in abundance with reports showing that 50 million tons are being created by chemical pulp industries each year. Lignin is useful due to its low weight material and the fact that it is more environmentally friendly than other alternatives. Lignin is neutral to CO2 release during the biodegradation process. Other biodegradable plastic processes such as polyethylene terephthalate (PET) have been found to release CO2 and water as waste products produced by the degrading microorganisms.

Lignin contains comparable chemical properties in comparison to current plastic chemicals, which includes reactive functional groups, the ability to form into films, high carbon percentage, and it shows versatility in relation to various chemical mixtures used with plastics. Lignin is also stable, and contains aromatic rings. It is both elastic and viscous yet flows smoothly in the liquid phase.  Most importantly lignin can improve on the current standards of plastics because it is antimicrobial in nature. It is being produced at such great quantities and is readily available for use as an emerging environmentally friendly polymer.

Petroleum-based plastics
Petroleum-based plastics are derived from petrochemicals, which are obtained from fossil crude oil, coal or natural gas. The most widely used petroleum-based plastics such as polyethylene terephthalate (PET), polyethylene (PE), polypropylene (PP), and polystyrene (PS) are not biodegradable. However, the following petroleum-based plastics listed are.

Polyglycolic acid (PGA) 
Polyglycolic acid is a thermoplastic polymer and an aliphatic polyester. PGA is often used in medical applications such as PGA sutures for its biodegradability. The ester linkage in the backbone of polyglycolic acid gives it hydrolytic instability. Thus polyglycolic acid can degrade into its nontoxic monomer, glycolic acid, through hydrolysis. This process can be expedited with esterases. In the body, glycolic acid can enter the tricarboxylic acid cycle, after which can be excreted as water and carbon dioxide.

Polybutylene succinate (PBS) 
Polybutylene succinate is a thermoplastic polymer resin that has properties comparable to propylene. It is used in packaging films for food and cosmetics. In the agricultural field, PBS is used as a biodegradable mulching film PBS can be degraded by Amycolatopsis sp. HT-6 and Penicillium sp. strain 14-3. In addition, Microbispora rosea, Excellospora japonica and E. viridilutea have been shown to consume samples of emulsified PBS.

Polycaprolactone (PCL) 
Polycaprolactone has gained prominence as an implantable biomaterial because the hydrolysis of its ester linkages offers its biodegradable properties. It has been shown that Bacillota and Pseudomonadota can degrade PCL. Penicillium sp. strain 26-1 can degrade high density PCL; though not as quickly as thermotolerant Aspergillus sp. strain ST-01. Species of clostridium can degrade PCL under anaerobic conditions.

Poly(vinyl alcohol) (PVA, PVOH) 
Poly(vinyl alcohol) is one of the few biodegradable vinyl polymers that is soluble in water. Due to its solubility in water (an inexpensive and harmless solvent), PVA has a wide range of applications including food packaging, textiles coating, paper coating, and healthcare products.

Polybutylene adipate terephthalate (PBAT) 
Polybutylene adipate terephthalate (PBAT) is a biodegradable random copolymer.

Home compostable plastics 
No international standard has been established to define home-compostable plastics (i.e. those which do not rely on industrial composting facilities), but national standards have been created in Australia (AS 5810 "biodegradable plastics suitable for home composting") and in France (NF T 51-800 "Specifications for plastics suitable for home composting"). The French standard is based on the "OK compost home certification scheme", developed by Belgian certifier TÜV Austria Belgium. The following are examples of plastics that have conformed to an established national standard for home compostability:

 BioPBS FD92 resin, maximum thickness 85 microns
 BWC BF 90A resin, maximum thickness 81 microns
 Ecopond Flex 162 resin, maximum thickness 65 microns
 HCPT-1 triple laminate, maximum thickness 119 microns
 HCFD-2 duplex laminate, maximum thickness 69 microns
 Torise TRBF90 resin, maximum thickness 43 microns

Factors affecting biodegradation 
One of the challenges for the design and use of biodegradable plastics is that biodegradability is a "system property". That is, whether a particular plastic item will biodegrade depends not only on the intrinsic properties of the item, but also on the conditions in the environment in which it ends up. The rate at which plastic biodegrades in a specific ecosystem depends on a wide range of environmental conditions, including temperature and the presence of specific microorganisms.

Intrinsic factors 
Chemical composition:
 Least to greatest resistance to biodegradation: n-alkanes > branched alkanes > low molecular weight aromatics > cyclic alkanes > high molecular weight aromatics = polar polymers

Physical properties:
 Shape
 Exposed surface area
 Thickness

Extrinsic factors 
Abiotic factors:
 Temperature
 Atmospheric water/salt concentration
 Photo-degradation
 Hydrolysis

Biotic factors:
 Presence of proper strains of microorganisms

Controversy 
Though the terms "compostable, "bioplastics", and "oxo-degradative plastics" are often used in place of "biodegradable plastics", these terms are not synonymous. The waste management infrastructure currently recycles regular plastic waste, incinerates it, or places it in a landfill. Mixing biodegradable plastics into the regular waste infrastructure poses some dangers to the environment. Thus, it is crucial to identify how to correctly decompose alternative plastic materials.

Compostable plastics 
Both compostable plastics and biodegradable plastics are materials that break down into their organic constituents; however, composting of some compostable plastics requires strict control of environmental factors, including higher temperatures, pressure and nutrient concentration, as well as specific chemical ratios. These conditions can only be recreated in industrial composting plants, which are few and far between. Thus, some plastics that are compostable can degrade only under highly controlled environments. Additionally, composting typically takes place in aerobic environments, while biodegradation may take place in anaerobic environments. Biologically-based polymers, sourced from non-fossil materials, can decompose naturally in the environment, whereas some plastics products made from biodegradable polymers require the assistance of anaerobic digesters or composting units to break down synthetic material during organic recycling processes.

Contrary to popular belief, non-biodegradable compostable plastics do indeed exist. These plastics will undergo biodegradation under composting conditions but will not begin degrading until they are met. In other words, these plastics cannot be claimed as “biodegradable” (as defined by both American and European Standards) due to the fact that they cannot biodegrade naturally in the biosphere. An example of a non-biodegradable compostable plastic is polylactic acid (PLA).

The ASTM standard definition outlines that a compostable plastic has to become "not visually distinguishable" at the same rate as something that has already been established as being compostable under the traditional definition.

Bioplastics 
A plastic is considered a bioplastic if it was produced partly or wholly with biologically sourced polymers. A plastic is considered biodegradable if it can degrade into water, carbon dioxide, and biomass in a given time frame (dependent on different standards). Thus, the terms are not synonymous. Not all bioplastics are biodegradable. An example of a non-biodegradable bioplastic is bio-based PET. PET is a petrochemical plastic, derived from fossil fuels. Bio-based PET is the same plastic but synthesized with bacteria. Bio-based PET has identical technical properties to its fossil-based counterpart.

Oxo-degradable plastics 
In addition, oxo-degradable plastics are commonly perceived to be biodegradable. However, they are simply conventional plastics with additives called prodegredants that accelerate the oxidation process. While oxo-degradable plastics rapidly break down through exposure to sunlight and oxygen, they persist as huge quantities of microplastics rather than any biological material.

Oxo-degradable plastics cannot be classified as biodegradable under American and European standards because they take too long to break down and leave plastic fragments not capable of being consumed by microorganisms. Although intended to facilitate biodegradation, oxo-degradable plastics often do not fragment optimally for microbial digestion.

Consumer labelling and greenwashing 

All materials are inherently biodegradable, whether it takes a few weeks or a million years to break down into organic matter and mineralize. Therefore, products that are classified as “biodegradable” but whose time and environmental constraints are not explicitly stated are misinforming consumers and lack transparency. Normally, credible companies convey the specific biodegradable conditions of their products, highlighting that their products are in fact biodegradable under national or international standards. Additionally, companies that label plastics with oxo-biodegradable additives as entirely biodegradable contribute to misinformation. Similarly, some brands may claim that their plastics are biodegradable when, in fact, they are non-biodegradable bioplastics.

In 2021, the European Commission's Scientific Advice Mechanism conducted an evidence review on biodegradable plastics and concluded that:
Labelling plastic items as ‘biodegradable’, without explaining what conditions are needed for them to biodegrade, causes confusion among consumers and other users. It could lead to contamination of waste streams and increased pollution or littering. Clear and accurate labelling is needed so that consumers can be confident of what to expect from plastic items, and how to properly use and dispose of them.

In response, the European Commission's Group of Chief Scientific Advisors recommended in 2021 to develop "coherent testing and certification standards for biodegradation of plastic in the open environment", including "testing and certification schemes evaluating actual biodegradation of biodegradable plastics in the context of their application in a specific receiving open environment".

Environmental impacts

Environmental benefits
Microbial degradation: The primary purpose of biodegradable plastics is to replace traditional plastics that persist in landfills and harm the environment. Therefore, the ability of microorganisms to break down these plastics is an incredible environmental advantage. Microbial degradation is accomplished by 3 steps: colonization of the plastic surface, hydrolysis, and mineralization. First, microorganisms populate the exposed plastics. Next, the bacteria secrete enzymes that bind to the carbon source or polymer substrates and then split the hydrocarbon bonds. The process results in the production of H2O and CO2. Despite the release of CO2 into the environment, biodegradable plastics leave a smaller footprint than petroleum-based plastics that accumulate in landfills and cause heavy pollution, which is why they are explored as alternatives to traditional plastics.

Municipal solid waste: According to a 2010 report of the United States Environmental Protection Agency (EPA) the US had 31 million tons of plastic waste, representing 12.4% of all municipal solid waste. Of that, 2.55 million tons were recovered. This 8.2% recovery was much less than the 34.1% overall recovery percentage for municipal solid waste.

Depressed plastics recovery rates can be attributed to conventional plastics are often commingled with organic wastes (food scraps, wet paper, and liquids), leading to accumulation of waste in landfills and natural habitats. On the other hand, composting of these mixed organics (food scraps, yard trimmings, and wet, non-recyclable paper) is a potential strategy for recovering large quantities of waste and dramatically increasing community recycling goals. As of 2015, food scraps and wet, non-recyclable paper respectively comprise 39.6 million and 67.9 million tons of municipal solid waste.

Biodegradable plastics can replace the non-degradable plastics in these waste streams, making municipal composting a significant tool to divert large amounts of otherwise nonrecoverable waste from landfills. Compostable plastics combine the utility of plastics (lightweight, resistance, relative low cost) with the ability to completely and fully compost in an industrial compost facility. Rather than worrying about recycling a relatively small quantity of commingled plastics, proponents argue that certified biodegradable plastics can be readily commingled with other organic wastes, thereby enabling composting of a much larger portion of nonrecoverable solid waste.

Commercial composting for all mixed organics then becomes commercially viable and economically sustainable. More municipalities can divert significant quantities of waste from overburdened landfills since the entire waste stream is now biodegradable and therefore easier to process. This move away from the use of landfills may help alleviate the issue of plastic pollution.

The use of biodegradable plastics, therefore, is seen as enabling the complete recovery of large quantities of municipal solid waste (via aerobic composting and feedstocks) that have heretofore been unrecoverable by other means except land filling or incineration.

Environmental concerns 
Oxo-biodegradation: There are allegations that biodegradable plastic bags may release metals, and may require a great deal of time to degrade in certain circumstances and that OBD (oxo-biodegradable) plastics may produce tiny fragments of plastic that do not continue to degrade at any appreciable rate regardless of the environment. The response of the Oxo-biodegradable Plastics Association (www.biodeg.org) is that OBD plastics do not contain metals. They contain salts of metals, which are not prohibited by legislation and are in fact necessary as trace-elements in the human diet. Oxo-biodegradation of low-density polyethylene containing a proprietary manganese-salt-based additive showed 91% biodegradation in a soil environment after 24 months.

Effect on food supply: There is also much debate about the total carbon, fossil fuel and water usage in manufacturing biodegradable bioplastics from natural materials and whether they are a negative impact to human food supply. To make  of polylactic acid, the most common commercially available compostable plastic,  of corn is required. Since as of 2010, approximately 270 million tonnes of plastic are made every year, replacing conventional plastic with corn-derived polylactic acid would remove 715.5 million tonnes from the world's food supply, at a time when global warming is reducing tropical farm productivity.

Methane release: There is concern that another greenhouse gas, methane, might be released when any biodegradable material, including truly biodegradable plastics, degrades in an anaerobic landfill environment. Methane production from 594 managed landfill environments is captured and used for energy; some landfills burn this off through a process called flaring to reduce the release of methane into the environment. In the US, most landfilled materials today go into landfills where they capture the methane biogas for use in clean, inexpensive energy. Incinerating non-biodegradable plastics will release carbon dioxide as well. Disposing of non-biodegradable plastics made from natural materials in anaerobic (landfill) environments will result in the plastic lasting for hundreds of years.

Biodegradation in the ocean: Biodegradable plastics that have not fully degraded are disposed of in the oceans by waste management facilities with the assumption that the plastics will eventually break down in a short amount of time. However, the ocean is not optimal for biodegradation, as the process favors warm environments with an abundance of microorganisms and oxygen. Remaining microfibers that have not undergone biodegradation can cause harm to marine life.

Energy costs for production
Various researchers have undertaken extensive life cycle assessments of biodegradable polymers to determine whether these materials are more energy efficient than polymers made by conventional fossil fuel-based means.  Research done by Gerngross, et al. estimates that the fossil fuel energy required to produce a kilogram of polyhydroxyalkanoate (PHA) is 50.4 MJ/kg, which coincides with another estimate by Akiyama, et al., who estimate a value between 50-59 MJ/kg. This information does not take into account the feedstock energy, which can be obtained from non-fossil fuel based methods. Polylactide (PLA) was estimated to have a fossil fuel energy cost of 54-56.7 from two sources, but recent developments in the commercial production of PLA by NatureWorks has eliminated some dependence of fossil fuel-based energy by supplanting it with wind power and biomass-driven strategies. They report making a kilogram of PLA with only 27.2 MJ of fossil fuel-based energy and anticipate that this number will drop to 16.6 MJ/kg in their next generation plants. In contrast, polypropylene and high-density polyethylene require 85.9 and 73.7 MJ/kg, respectively, but these values include the embedded energy of the feedstock because it is based on fossil fuel.

Gerngross reports a 2.65 kg total fossil fuel energy equivalent (FFE) required to produce a single kilogram of PHA, while polyethylene only requires 2.2 kg FFE. Gerngross assesses that the decision to proceed forward with any biodegradable polymer alternative will need to take into account the priorities of society with regard to energy, environment, and economic cost.

Furthermore, it is important to realize the youth of alternative technologies. Technology to produce PHA, for instance, is still in development today, and energy consumption can be further reduced by eliminating the fermentation step, or by utilizing food waste as feedstock. The use of alternative crops other than corn, such as sugar cane from Brazil, are expected to lower energy requirements. For instance, "manufacturing of PHAs by fermentation in Brazil enjoys a favorable energy consumption scheme where bagasse is used as source of renewable energy."

Many biodegradable polymers that come from renewable resources (i.e. starch-based, PHA, PLA) also compete with food production, as the primary feedstock is currently corn. For the US to meet its current output of plastics production with BPs, it would require 1.62 square meters per kilogram produced.

Regulations/standards
To ensure the integrity of products labelled as "biodegradable", the following standards have been established:

United States 
The Biodegradable Products Institute (BPI) is the primary certification organization in the US. ASTM International defines methods to test for biodegradable plastic, both anaerobically and aerobically, as well as in marine environments. The specific subcommittee responsibility for overseeing these standards falls on the Committee D20.96 on Environmentally Degradable Plastics and Bio based Products. The current ASTM standards are defined as standard specifications and standard test methods. Standard specifications create a pass or fail scenario whereas standard test methods identify the specific testing parameters for facilitating specific time frames and toxicity of biodegradable tests on plastics.

Anaerobic conditions 

Both standards above indicate that a minimum of 70% of the material should have biodegraded by 30 days (ASTM D5511-18) or the duration of the testing procedure (ASTM D5526-18) to be considered biodegradable under anaerobic conditions. Test methodologies provide guidelines on testing but provide no pass/fail guidance on results.

Aerobic conditions 

Both standards above outline procedures for testing and labelling biodegradability in aerobic composting conditions. Plastics can be classified as biodegradable in aerobic environments when 90% of the material is fully mineralized into  within 180 days (~6 months). Specifications carry pass/fail criteria and reporting.

European Union standards

Anaerobic conditions 

Similar to the US standards, the European standard requires that 90% of the polymer fragments be fully mineralized into  within 6 months.

Aerobic conditions

Future European standards 
In 2021, the European Commission's Scientific Advice Mechanism recommended to the Commission to develop new certification and testing standards for biodegradation of plastic in the open environment, including:
 evaluation of actual biodegradation performance, and assessment of environmental risks, in specific open environments such as soils, rivers and oceans
 testing of biodegradation  under laboratory and simulated environmental conditions
 development of a materials catalogue and relative biodegradation rates in a range of environments
 "clear and effective labelling" for consumers, manufacturers and vendors to ensure proper disposal of biodegradable plastics.

In November 2022, the European Commission proposed an EU regulation to replace the 1994 Packaging and packaging waste directive, along with a communication to clarify the labels biobased, biodegradable, and compostable.

British standards 

In October 2020 British Standards published new standards for biodegradable plastic. In order to comply with the standards biodegradable plastic must degrade to a wax which contains no microplastics or nanoplastics within two years. The breakdown of the plastics can be triggered by exposure to sunlight, air and water. Chief executive of Polymateria, Niall Dunne, said his company had created polyethylene film which degraded within 226 days and plastic cups which broke down in 336 days.

Role of genetic engineering and synthetic biology 
With rising concern for environmental ramifications of plastic waste, researchers have been exploring the application of genetic engineering and synthetic biology for optimizing biodegradable plastic production. This involves altering the endogenous genetic makeup or other biological systems of organisms.

In 1995, an article titled “Production of Polyhydroxyalkanoates, a Family of Biodegradable Plastics and Elastomers, in Bacteria and Plants” describes the use of synthetic biology to increase the yield of polyhydroxyalkanoates (PHAs), specifically in Arabidopsis plants. Similarly, a study conducted in 1999 investigated how the oil seed rape plant can be genetically modified to produce PHBVs. Although a high yield was not produced, this displays the early use of genetic engineering for production of biodegradable plastics.

Efforts are still being made in the direction of biodegradable plastic production through genetic fabrication and re-design. A paper published in 2014 titled “Genetic engineering increases yield of biodegradable plastic from cyanobacteria” outlines procedures conducted to produce a higher yield of PHBs that is industrially comparable. Previous research indicated that both Rre37 and SigE proteins are separately responsible for the activation of PHB production in the Synechocystis strain of cyanobacteria. Thus, in this study, the Synechocystis strain was modified to overexpress Rre37 and SigE proteins together under nitrogen-limited conditions.

Currently, a student-run research group at the University of Virginia (Virginia iGEM 2019) is in the process of genetically engineering Escherichia coli to convert styrene (monomer of polystyrene) into P3HBs (a type of PHA). The project aims to demonstrate that waste polystyrene can effectively be used as a carbon source for biodegradable plastic production, tackling both issues of polystyrene waste accumulation in landfills and high production cost of PHAs.

Biodegradable conducting polymers in the medical field

Biodegradable Conducting Polymers (CPs) are a polymeric material designed for applications within the human body. Important properties of this material are its electrical conductivity comparable to traditional conductors and its biodegradability. The medical applications of biodegradable CPs are attractive to medical specialties such as tissue engineering and regenerative medicine. In tissue engineering, the key focus is on providing damaged organs with physicochemical cues to damaged organs for repair. This is achieved through use of nanocomposite scaffolding. Regenerative medicine applications are designed to regenerate cells along with improving the repair process of the body. The use of biodegradable CPs can also be implemented into biomedical imaging along with implants, and more.

	The design of biodegradable CPs began with the blending of biodegradable polymers including polylactides, polycaprolactone, and polyurethanes. This design triggered innovation into what is being engineered as of the year 2019. The current biodegradable CPs is applicable for use in the biomedical field. The compositional architecture of current biodegradable CPs includes the conductivity properties of oligomer-based biodegradable polymers implemented into compositions of linear, starshaped, or hyperbranched formations. Another implementation to enhance the biodegradable architecture of the CPs is by use of monomers and conjugated links that are degradable. The biodegradable polymers used in biomedical applications typically consist of hydrolyzable esters and hydrazones. These molecules, upon external stimulation, go on to be cleaved and broken down. The cleaving activation process can be achieved through use of an acidic environment, increasing the temperature, or by use of enzymes. Three categories of biodegradable CP composites have been established in relation to their chemistry makeup. The first category includes partially biodegradable CP blends of conductive and biodegradable polymeric materials. The second category includes conducting oligomers of biodegradable CPs. The third category is that of modified and degradable monpmer units along with use of degradable conjugated links for use in biodegradable CPs polymers.

See also
 Biodegradation
 Biodegradable additives
 Biodegradable bags
 Biodegradable waste
 Bioplastic
 BioSphere Plastic
 Cellophane
 Dedicated bio-based chemical
 Economics of plastics processing
 Microplastics
 Organisms breaking down plastic
 Photodegradation
 Plastic bag
 Plastics 2020 Challenge

Further reading 

 Biodegradable Plastics and Marine Litter
 

 Biodegradability of plastics in the open environment (comprehensive evidence review by the European Union, 2021)

References

 
Environment and society